Cirphula is a genus of short-horned grasshoppers in the family Acrididae. There are at least four described species in Cirphula, found in Australia.

Species
These four species belong to the genus Cirphula:
 Cirphula carbonaria (Serville, 1838)
 Cirphula flavotibialis Sjöstedt, 1936 (Eyre Cirphula)
 Cirphula jungi Brancsik, 1895
 Cirphula pyrrhocnemis (Stål, 1861) (Variable Cirphula)

References

External links

 

Acrididae